El Bosque Airport (es) , is a military airport located in El Bosque, a southern suburb of Santiago, Chile.

Runway 03 has an additional  displaced threshold. The El Bosque VOR-DME (Ident: BQE) is located on the field. There is distant high terrain northeast through southeast.

See also

Transport in Chile
List of airports in Chile

References

External links
OpenStreetMap - El Bosque
OurAirports - El Bosque
SkyVector - El Bosque

Transport in Santiago
Airports in Santiago Metropolitan Region